Sartang is a village in Bivanij Rural District, in the Central District of Dalahu County, Kermanshah Province, Iran. At the 2006 census, its population was 222, in 51 families.

References 

Populated places in Dalahu County